Nighat Mirza is a Pakistani politician who is currently a member of Senate of Pakistan, representing Muttahida Qaumi Movement.

Education
She has done BA from Gov. College for Women between 1973 and 1974 and L.L.B. from Sindh Muslim Law College between 1975 and 1976.

She further done MA International Relations from University of Karachi between 2011 and 2012, and MA Islamic Studies from University of Karachi between 2003 and 2006.

Political career

She was elected to the Senate of Pakistan as a candidate of Muttahida Qaumi Movement in 2015 Pakistani Senate election.

References

Living people
Pakistani senators (14th Parliament)
Year of birth missing (living people)